Iau (Iaw, Yau) or Turu is a Lakes Plain language of West Papua, Indonesia, spoken by about 600 people. Most speakers are monolingual, and their number is growing. Other peoples in the western Lakes Plain area speak basic Iau. Iau is heavily tonal, with 11 tones on nouns and 19 simple and compound tones on verbs.

Names and dialects
Dialects are Foi (Poi), Turu, Edopi (Elopi), and Iau proper; these may be distinct enough to be considered separate languages.  Foi is spoken on the large Tariku River (Rouffaer River), Turu on the Van Daalen River, Iau proper between the rivers, and Edopi at the juncture of the Tariku and Kliki (Fou) rivers.

Another name for the language is Urundi ~ Ururi. Dosobou (Dou, Doufou) is specifically Edopi.

In Puncak Jaya Regency, Iau dialects are spoken in Bakusi, Duita, Fawi, and Fi villages, located between the Rouffaer River and Van Daalen River in Fawi District.

Phonology
The following discussion is based on Bateman (1990a).

Consonants

There are six consonants. /t d/ are dental; /s/ is alveolar. /b d/ are implosive, and may be realized as nasals ,  before the low nasal vowel /a/ ([ã]). /d/ may also be realized as the liquid  before /a/.

/f/ is pronounced ~ word-initially, or optionally as  before the high nonback vowels /i ɨ/. The labial allophone  is preferred in the Foi dialect; the glottal allophone  is preferred in Turu. /f/ is always pronounced  word-medially and as an unreleased plosive  word-finally. /f/ is the only consonant that can occur word-finally, and occurs only in a limited number of words.

Vowels

The low vowel is always nasalized, except when it is a component of a diphthong. The open-mid front vowel varies between [ɛ] and [æ].

The following diphthongs exist:

No diphthongs begin with /ɪ i i̝/ or end in /a ɔ/.

There are two triphthongs: /aui/ and /aʊɪ/. The back components of these triphthongs are realized as unrounded [ɯ] and [ɯ̽].

Syllables 
Syllables consist minimally of a vowel. They may include a single onset consonant and/or a single coda consonant. Diphthongs and triphthongs are attested. The template is (C)(V)V(V)(C). The tone-bearing unit is the syllable.

Stress 
Stress in Iau is predictable: it falls on the final syllable of disyllabic words. (Words may not be longer than two syllables.) The interaction between stress and tone is not clear.

Tone 
Iau is the most tonally complex Lakes Plain language. Unlike other Lakes Plain languages which can be disyllabic or trisyllabic, Iau word structure is predominantly monosyllabic. Iau has eight phonemic tones, transcribed by Bateman using numerical tone numbers (with 1 high and 5 low, as in much of Africa and America but the opposite of the convention used with Asian languages): two level tones (low and high), two rising tones (low rising and high rising), three falling tones (high-low, high-mid, and mid-low), and one falling-rising tone. Phonetically, these are:
high 2  
mid 3  
high rising 21  
low rising 43  
high–low falling 24  
high–mid falling 23  
mid–low falling 34  
falling–rising 243 

A sequence of two tones (called a tone cluster) may occur on one syllable. There are eleven tone clusters that can occur on verbs to mark aspect; only three of these can occur on nouns.

Some minimal sets in Iau illustrating phonemic tonal contrasts:

 'father-in-law'
 'fire'
 'snake'
 'path'
 'thorn'
 'flower'
 'small eel'
 'tree fern'
 'pig wallow'
 'mosquito'
 'man'
 'edible tuber'
 'calf of leg'
 'inlet of body of water'
 'flooring'

Examples of monosyllabic words with the three 'compound' tones are  'mountain',  'hand' and  'knife'.

There is downdrift after low (3) and falling tones, and also of (24) following (243). A high-rising (21) tone rises slightly after another. 

Tone is lexical on nouns, pronouns, numerals, prepositions and other parts of speech, but verbs are unmarked for tone. In verbs, each tone represents a different aspect or aktionsart. The complex system of aspectual marking via tone is discussed in Bateman (1986).

Aspect
Iau also displays complex tonal verb morphology. Verbal roots do not have any inherent tone, but tone is used to mark aspect on verbs. Example paradigms:

Mood
Tonal alternations can also serve as final mood and speech act particles.
tone 2: speaker assumes the information is correct (such as rhetorical questions)
tone 34: speaker asks a question to confirm what he believes is true (such as yes-no questions)
tone 23: speaker is uncertain about the actual state of affairs

Example sentences:

References

Bateman, Janet. 1982. The topic-comment construction in Iau. In Marit Kana (ed.), Workpapers in Indonesian linguistics, vol. 1, 28–49. Irian Jaya, Indonesian: Universitas Cenderawasih.
Bateman, Janet. 1986. Iau verb morphology. NUSA: Linguistic Studies of Indonesian and Other Languages in Indonesia 26. Jakarta: Universitas Katolik Atma Jaya. 1–76. http://sealang.net/archives/nusa/pdf/nusa-v26.pdf
Bateman, Janet. 1990a. Iau segmental and tone phonology. NUSA: Linguistic Studies of Indonesian and Other Languages in Indonesia 32. 29–42. http://sealang.net/archives/nusa/pdf/nusa-v32-p29-42.pdf
Bateman, Janet. 1990b. Pragmatic functions of the tone morphemes on illocutionary force particles in Iau. NUSA: Linguistic Studies of Indonesian and Other Languages in Indonesia 32. 1–28.
Edmondson, A., Janet Bateman & Helen Miehle. 1992. Tone contours and tone clusters in Iau. Proceedings of the Annual Meeting of the Berkeley Linguistics Society: Special Session on the Typology of Tone Languages, vol. 18, 92–103. Berkeley, CA: Berkeley Linguistics Society. http://journals.linguisticsociety.org/proceedings/index.php/BLS/article/viewFile/1544/1327

Tonal languages
Languages of western New Guinea
Tariku languages